Peter Štefančič (born 3 March 1947) is a Slovenian ski jumper. He competed at the 1968 Winter Olympics and the 1972 Winter Olympics.

References

1947 births
Living people
Slovenian male ski jumpers
Olympic ski jumpers of Yugoslavia
Ski jumpers at the 1968 Winter Olympics
Ski jumpers at the 1972 Winter Olympics
Sportspeople from Kranj
20th-century Slovenian people